Sir Brian George Keith Alleyne, KC (born 28 April 1943) is a Dominican jurist, politician and judge.

Early life 

He was the son of Keith Alleyne, the onetime attorney general of the Windward Islands and Attorney General of Grenada who was murdered in 1974.

Alleyne served for 16 years in the House of Assembly of Dominica and in various capacities within the Dominican government under Eugenia Charles. He was Minister of Foreign Affairs from 1990 to 1995. He also served as Queen's Counsel and as Attorney General of the Windward Islands.

Alleyne was elected as the political leader of Dominica Freedom Party in 1995, but lost the 1995 elections, and resigned as the political leader of the party in June 1996. 

In July 1996 he was appointed high court judge of the Eastern Caribbean Supreme Court. Beginning in 2005 he served as the Acting Chief Justice of the Eastern Caribbean Supreme Court, until retiring from the position in April 2008. He wassucceeded as Chief Justice by Hugh Anthony Rawlins. As Chief Justice, he was the supreme judicial officer of the courts of Anguilla, Antigua and Barbuda, the British Virgin Islands, Dominica, Grenada, Montserrat, Saint Kitts and Nevis, Saint Lucia, and Saint Vincent and the Grenadines.

Sir Brian is married to Brenda Alleyne, with whom he has three children. He was knighted in 2007.

References

Biography at the Dominica Academy of Arts and Sciences

1943 births
Living people
Dominica lawyers
Members of the House of Assembly of Dominica
Foreign ministers of Dominica
Dominica Freedom Party politicians
Chief justices of the Eastern Caribbean Supreme Court
Dominica judges
Dominica judges on the courts of Anguilla
Dominica judges on the courts of Antigua and Barbuda
Dominica judges on the courts of the British Virgin Islands
Dominica judges on the courts of Grenada
Dominica judges on the courts of Montserrat
Dominica judges on the courts of Saint Lucia
Dominica judges on the courts of Saint Kitts and Nevis
Dominica judges on the courts of Saint Vincent and the Grenadines
Dominica judges of international courts and tribunals